Tonka Obretenova, known as Baba Tonka (Баба Тонка), was a female Bulgarian revolutionary, born in 1812 in Rousse.

Her parents, Toncho Postavchiyata (Тончо Поставчията) and Minka Toncheva (Минка Тончева), were from the village of Cherven. She married Tiho Obretenov — a famous tailor and tradesman in Rousse. They had seven children (five sons and two daughters) all of whom participated in the Bulgarian revolutionary movement. Obretenova herself lent major support to the revolutionary committee - she was famous for sheltering a number of revolutionary leaders. The Rousse Revolutionary Committee, the most important one in the interior of Bulgaria, was established by her son Nikola Obretenov, in her house. Baba Tonka buried Stefan Karadzha, and managed to preserve his skull.

Her sons Angel, Petar, Nikola, and Georgi took part in different detachments and were killed, or sent into long exile. Her younger daughter, Anastasiya (Анастасия; also called: Siya, Сия) married Zahari Stoyanov — a revolutionary, writer and publicist.

Baba Tonka Cove in Livingston Island in the South Shetland Islands, Antarctica is named after Tonka Obretenova.

References

Bulgarian revolutionaries
People from Ruse, Bulgaria
April Uprising of 1876
1812 births
1893 deaths
19th-century Bulgarian people